Palena is a Chilean commune located in Palena Province, Los Lagos Region. The commune is named after Palena Lake.

Demographics
The population grew by 2.2% (37 persons) between the 1992 and 2002 censuses.

Administration
As a commune, Palena is a third-level administrative division of Chile administered by a municipal council, headed by an alcalde who is directly elected every four years. The 2008-2012 alcalde is Aladin Delgado Casanova (RN).

Within the electoral divisions of Chile, Palena is represented in the Chamber of Deputies by Gabriel Ascencio (PDC) and Alejandro Santana (RN) as part of the 58th electoral district, together with Castro, Ancud, Quemchi, Dalcahue, Curaco de Vélez, Quinchao, Puqueldón, Chonchi, Queilén, Quellón, Chaitén, Hualaihué and Futaleufú. The commune is represented in the Senate by Camilo Escalona Medina (PS) and Carlos Kuschel Silva (RN) as part of the 17th senatorial constituency (Los Lagos Region).

References

Communes of Chile
Populated places in Palena Province